2019 Texas shooting may refer to:

 2019 Dallas courthouse shooting  on June 17
 2019 El Paso shooting  on August 3 
 Midland–Odessa shootings  on August 31 
 Pecan Park raid  in Houston on January 28

See also 
 List of mass shootings in the United States in 2019